Min Kyung-Gab (born 27 August 1970) is a South Korean former wrestler who competed in the 1992 Summer Olympics.

References

External links
 

1970 births
Living people
Olympic wrestlers of South Korea
Wrestlers at the 1992 Summer Olympics
South Korean male sport wrestlers
Olympic bronze medalists for South Korea
Olympic medalists in wrestling
Asian Games medalists in wrestling
Wrestlers at the 1994 Asian Games
Medalists at the 1992 Summer Olympics
Medalists at the 1994 Asian Games
Asian Games gold medalists for South Korea
20th-century South Korean people
21st-century South Korean people